Joshua Robinson (born 4 October 1985) is an Australian athlete specialising in the javelin throw. He represented his country at the 2016 Summer Olympics in Rio de Janeiro narrowly missing the final. He earlier competed at the 2007 World Championships but also without qualifying for the final.

His personal best in the event is 85.11 metres set in Perth in 2016.

International competitions

1Representing Asia-Pacific

References

1985 births
Living people
Australian male javelin throwers
Athletes (track and field) at the 2016 Summer Olympics
Olympic athletes of Australia
Athletes from Brisbane
Athletes (track and field) at the 2014 Commonwealth Games
Commonwealth Games competitors for Australia